Jesse Burch (born Jesse E. Johnson; September 2, 1970) is an American actor.

Filmography

Film

Television

Video games

References

External links

1970 births
American male television actors
Living people
American male voice actors
People from Fort Belvoir, Virginia